Ebrahim Kandi (also Romanized as Ebrāhīm Kandī; also known as Varāghūl (Persian: وراغول) and Vārghūl) is a village in Meshgin-e Sharqi Rural District, in the Central District of Meshgin Shahr County, Ardabil Province, Iran. At the 2006 census, its population was 272, in 61 families.

References 

Towns and villages in Meshgin Shahr County